Meronera venustula is a species of rove beetle in the family Staphylinidae. It is found in North America.

References

Further reading

External links

 

Aleocharinae
Articles created by Qbugbot
Beetles described in 1839
Beetles of North America